Angophora inopina, commonly known as the Charmhaven apple, is a species of small, often multi-stemmed tree that is endemic to the Central Coast of New South Wales. It has rough bark on the trunk and branches, lance-shaped adult leaves, flower buds in groups of three or seven, white or creamy white flowers and ribbed, cup-shaped fruit.

Description
It has greyish, fibrous bark on the trunk and branches.

Taxonomy and naming
Angophora inopina was first formally described in 1997 by Ken Hill from specimens collected near Charmhaven in the same year. The specific epithet (inopina) is from the Latin inopinatus, meaning "unexpected", referring to the occurrence of this previously undescribed species near Sydney.

Distribution and habitat
Charmhaven apple grows sandy soil over sandstone in woodland with a dense, shrubby understorey. It has a patchy distribution from Lake Macquarie to near the Hunter River and is most common in the Wyong and Lake Macquarie local government areas.

Conservation status
This eucalypt is listed as "vulnerable" under the Australian Government Environment Protection and Biodiversity Conservation Act 1999 and the New South Wales Government Threatened Species Conservation Act 1995. The main threats to the species are habitat loss and fragmentation, changes to the water table, frequent fires, trampling and competition from weeds.

References

inopina
Flora of New South Wales
Plants described in 1997